Keren Peles Toor (born March 11, 1979) is an Israeli singer-songwriter, poet and pianist.

Music career
Peles graduated from the Rimon School of Jazz and Contemporary Music. In 2005, she became famous for her songwriting for Miri Mesika and Shiri Maimon.

Peles' debut album, If This Is Life was released in July 2006 and certified gold after selling 20,000 copies. Sne wrote all of its songs. She was nominated for female singer of the year (2006) by Galgalatz, and named Israeli Singer of the Year by the Israeli radio stations.

In April 2008, her second album, Mabool (Flood), was released. In September it went gold and months later she was named Israel's Singer of the Year again.

Peles has written songs for Harel Skaat, Amir Fey Gutman, and Boaz Mauda ("Oreach Ba'olam").

Personal life
Keren Peles married website developer Tomer Grencel in June 2009. The couple separated in 2010.

Discography

References

External links

1979 births
Living people
Israeli people of Romanian-Jewish descent
21st-century Israeli women singers